Casey May Kopua  (née Williams; born 19 June 1985) is a retired New Zealand international netball player and former captain of the New Zealand national netball team, the Silver Ferns, and the Waikato Bay of Plenty Magic.

Kopua became a member of the New Zealand national netball team (the Silver Ferns) in 2004, making her on-court debut in 2005 against Barbados. She also played in the New Zealand U21 netball team that won gold at the 2005 World Youth Netball Championships in Florida. During her career she has won gold medals at the 2006 and 2010 Commonwealth Games and the 2009 World Netball Series, and silver medals at the 2007 and 2011 World Netball Championships. In 2008, she co-captained the team with Laura Langman, stepping into the role of acting captain later that year following an injury to Julie Seymour. In July 2009, Kopua became the 23rd captain of the Silver Ferns, taking over from Seymour who retired from the game.

 In domestic netball, Kopua played her entire career with the Waikato Bay of Plenty Magic, starting  in 2003. During the 2008 ANZ Championship season, she was named the Holden Captiva player of the championship, winning a new car.

In the 2011 Queen's Birthday Honours, Kopua was appointed an Officer of the New Zealand Order of Merit, alongside former Silver Ferns coach Ruth Aitken, for services to netball in New Zealand.

On 11 October 2014, Kopua became the most capped New Zealand netball captain in history, playing her 63rd test as captain of the team in the 3rd test of the 2014 Constellation Cup against Australia. In the fourth quarter of that match, Kopua suffered a suspected dislocated patella (knee injury). Scans later revealed that Kopua also ruptured her patella tendon. Three days later Kopua underwent surgery to repair her patella tendon.

In 2017, still rehabing from her surgery, Kopua announced her retirement from the Silver Ferns, stating she would return to the Waikato Bay of Plenty Magic in 2018, but would not be available for international selection. Kopua was coaxed back to the national team by Noeline Taurua for the 2019 Netball World Cup. She retired from netball after the World Cup.

Personal life
In December 2012, Kopua married Hamilton lawyer Terry Kopua. On 21 May 2016, the couple announced the birth of their daughter. They had a second child, a boy, in 2020, and another son on Christmas Eve 2021.

References

External links 
2011 ANZ Championship profile

1985 births
Living people
New Zealand netball players
New Zealand international netball players
Commonwealth Games gold medallists for New Zealand
Netball players at the 2006 Commonwealth Games
Netball players at the 2010 Commonwealth Games
Netball players at the 2014 Commonwealth Games
Commonwealth Games silver medallists for New Zealand
Commonwealth Games medallists in netball
2007 World Netball Championships players
2011 World Netball Championships players
2015 Netball World Cup players
2019 Netball World Cup players
Waikato Bay of Plenty Magic players
ANZ Championship players
Halbert-Kohere family
Officers of the New Zealand Order of Merit
Sportspeople from Hamilton, New Zealand
New Zealand international Fast5 players
National Bank Cup players
Medallists at the 2006 Commonwealth Games
Medallists at the 2010 Commonwealth Games
Medallists at the 2014 Commonwealth Games